Mufti Sufi Iqbal is a Muslim religious leader and member of the Tableeghi Jamaat in Pakistan. Many of his followers were involved in the Pakistan coup attempt of 1995.

References

Pakistani religious leaders
Living people
Year of birth missing (living people)